Luka Ciganović (12 January 1915 – 9 January 1994) was a Croatian water polo player. He competed at the 1936 Summer Olympics and the 1948 Summer Olympics.

References

1915 births
1994 deaths
Sportspeople from Dubrovnik
Croatian male water polo players
Croatian people of Serbian descent
Olympic water polo players of Yugoslavia
Water polo players at the 1936 Summer Olympics
Water polo players at the 1948 Summer Olympics